Rinzia medifila, commonly known as the Parker Range rinzia, is a plant species of the family Myrtaceae endemic to Western Australia.

The shrub is found in a small area of the Goldfields-Esperance region of Western Australia near Yilgarn.

References

medifila
Endemic flora of Western Australia
Myrtales of Australia
Rosids of Western Australia
Endangered flora of Australia
Plants described in 2017
Taxa named by Malcolm Eric Trudgen
Taxa named by Barbara Lynette Rye